Blattella biligata, also known by the common name tworidge roach, is a species from the genus Blattella.

References

Cockroaches
Insects described in 1868